Parvulastra dyscrita is a species of starfish belonging to the family Asterinidae. The species is found in Southern Africa.

References

Asterinidae
Fauna of the Atlantic Ocean
Fauna of the Indian Ocean
Animals described in 1923
Taxa named by Hubert Lyman Clark